World of Trouble  (foaled March 23, 2015) is an American Thoroughbred racehorse and the winner of the 2019 Jaipur Invitational Stakes.

Career
World of Trouble's first race was on August 10, 2017, at Gulfstream Park, which he won. He won a series of races in 2018. He captured the Pasco Stakes on January 20. In August, he won the Quick Call Stakes, then won the Allied Forces Stakes in September. He then won the Marion Country Florida Sire Stakes in December to finish off 2018.

World of Trouble began a four-race win streak in January 2019. He won the Gulfstream Park Turf Sprint Stakes on January 26. Then on April 6, he captured the Carter Handicap. He then won the Twin Spires Turf Sprint Stakes on May 3, then won the Jaipur Invitational Stakes on June 8. Through 2019, he registered 13 career starts, winning nine time, finishing second twice, and finishing third once, with career earnings of $1,263,300.

Pedigree

References

2015 racehorse births